The 2019 NBA All-Star Game was an exhibition basketball game that was played on February 17, 2019, during the National Basketball Association's (NBA) 2018–19 season. It was the 68th edition of the NBA All-Star Game, and was played at the Spectrum Center in Charlotte, North Carolina, at the home of the Charlotte Hornets. Team LeBron defeated Team Giannis, 178–164. This was the second time that the NBA All-Star Game format was not Eastern Conference versus Western Conference. Charlotte was announced as host on May 24, 2017. This was the second time that Charlotte hosted the All-Star Game; the first time was in 1991, at the Hornets' previous home arena Charlotte Coliseum.

Charlotte was originally selected to host the 2017 All-Star Game, but it was moved to New Orleans that year because of controversy surrounding North Carolina's Public Facilities Privacy & Security Act. The 2019 game was televised by TNT for the 17th straight year, while a special “Players Only” alternate telecast was aired on TBS.

All-Star Game

Coaches

The two teams were coached from their respective conference. Mike Budenholzer, coach of the Milwaukee Bucks, was named as the head coach for Team Giannis. Michael Malone, coach of the Denver Nuggets, was named as the head coach for Team LeBron.

Rosters
The rosters for the All-Star Game are selected through a voting process. The NBA partnered with Google and Twitter counting  hashtags as fan votes. The starters were chosen by the fans, media, and current NBA players. Fans made up 50% of the vote, and NBA players and media each comprised 25% of the vote. The two guards and three frontcourt players who received the highest cumulative vote totals were named the All-Star starters. NBA head coaches will vote for the reserves for their respective conferences, none of which can be players from their own team. Each coach selects two guards, three frontcourt players and two wild cards, with each selected player ranked in order of preference within each category. If a multi-position player is to be selected, coaches are encouraged to vote for the player at the position that was "most advantageous for the All-Star team", regardless of where the player was listed on the All-Star ballot or the position he was listed in box scores.

The All-Star Game starters were announced on January 24, 2019. Kyrie Irving of the Boston Celtics and Kemba Walker of the Charlotte Hornets were named the backcourt starters in the East, earning their sixth and third all-star appearances, respectively. Kawhi Leonard of the Toronto Raptors and Giannis Antetokounmpo of the Milwaukee Bucks were named the frontcourt starters in the East, both earning their third all-star appearances. Joining in the East frontcourt was Joel Embiid of the Philadelphia 76ers, his second selection.

Stephen Curry of the Golden State Warriors and James Harden of the Houston Rockets were named to the starting backcourt in the West, earning their sixth and seventh all-star appearances, respectively. In the frontcourt, Kevin Durant of the Golden State Warriors was named to his tenth career all-star game, along with Paul George of the Oklahoma City Thunder and LeBron James of the Los Angeles Lakers, their sixth and 15th all-star selections, respectively.

The All-Star Game reserves were announced on January 31, 2019. The West reserves included Russell Westbrook of the Oklahoma City Thunder, his eighth selection, Klay Thompson of the Golden State Warriors, his fifth selection, LaMarcus Aldridge of the San Antonio Spurs, his seventh selection, Damian Lillard of the Portland Trail Blazers, his fourth selection, Anthony Davis of the New Orleans Pelicans, his sixth selection, Nikola Jokić of the Denver Nuggets, his first selection, and Karl-Anthony Towns of the Minnesota Timberwolves, his second selection.

The East reserves included Kyle Lowry of the Toronto Raptors, his fifth selection, Khris Middleton of the Milwaukee Bucks, his first selection, Bradley Beal of the Washington Wizards, his second selection, Victor Oladipo of the Indiana Pacers, his second selection, Ben Simmons of the Philadelphia 76ers, his first selection, Nikola Vučević of the Orlando Magic, his first selection, and Blake Griffin of the Detroit Pistons, his sixth selection.

On February 1, 2019, Commissioner Adam Silver named Dwyane Wade and Dirk Nowitzki as special team roster additions for the game, citing their contributions to the sport. They were selected in the final round of the 2019 All-Star Draft, making each roster consist of 13 players.

Italics indicates leading vote-getters per conference

 Victor Oladipo was unable to play due to a knee injury.
 D'Angelo Russell was selected as Victor Oladipo's replacement.
 Special roster addition.

Draft
The draft took place on February 7, 2019, and was televised by TNT. This was the first time that the All-Star Game Draft was televised, after the league was criticized for not televising the draft the previous year. LeBron James and Giannis Antetokounmpo were named as captains for receiving the most votes from the West and East, respectively. The first eight players drafted are starters. The next 14 players (seven from each conference) were chosen by NBA head coaches. The final two selections were selected from the special team roster additions to the game. NBA Commissioner Adam Silver will select the replacement for any player unable to participate in the All-Star Game, choosing a player from the same conference as the player who is being replaced. Silver's selection would join the team that drafted the replaced player. If a replaced player is a starter, the head coach of that team will choose a new starter from his cast of players instead.

James picked Kevin Durant with his first pick, and Antetokounmpo picked Stephen Curry second. After the draft, James traded 16th pick Russell Westbrook to Antetokounmpo for 13th pick Ben Simmons. Team Giannis was the home team due to the Eastern Conference having home team status for the game.

*Ben Simmons was traded to Team LeBron and Russell Westbrook went to Team Giannis.

Lineups

Game

All-Star Weekend

NBA on TNT American Express Road Show
The 2019 All-Star Weekend began on Thursday, February 14, 2019, with the annual NBA on TNT American Express Road Show, a live broadcast of Inside the NBA that took place at The Fillmore Charlotte in Charlotte, North Carolina, and was hosted by Ernie Johnson Jr., Charles Barkley, Kenny Smith and Shaquille O'Neal, with special performances by Chris Tucker (Thursday) and Rae Sremmurd (Friday).

Celebrity Game

Rising Stars Challenge

Skills Challenge

Three Point Contest

Slam Dunk Contest

References

External links
2019 NBA All-Star Game at nba.com

2019 NBA All-Star Game
Basketball competitions in Charlotte, North Carolina
All-Star
NBA All-Star Game
NBA All-Star Game
American sports television specials
ABS-CBN television specials